"The Empire of the Ants" is a 1905 short story by H. G. Wells about the littleness of humanity and the tenuousness of the dominion Homo sapiens enjoys on Earth.  A 1977 film, Empire of the Ants, was loosely based on Wells' story.

Plot summary
"The Empire of the Ants" features a Brazilian captain, Gerilleau, who is ordered to take his gunboat, the Benjamin Constant, to assist the inhabitants of the town of Badama, in the "Upper Amazon", "against a plague of ants". A Lancashire engineer named Holroyd, from whose point of view the story is, for the most part, told, accompanies him. They find a species of large black ant that has evolved advanced intelligence and has used it to make tools and organize aggression. Before arriving in Badama, Captain Gerilleau encounters a cuberta which has been taken over by the ants, which have killed and mutilated two sailors. After Capt. Gerilleau sends his second in command, Lieutenant da Cunha, aboard the vessel, the ants attack him and he dies painfully, apparently poisoned. The next day, after burning the cuberta, the Benjamin Constant arrives off Badama. The town is deserted and all its inhabitants dead or dispersed. Fearing the ants and their poison, Capt. Gerilleau contents himself with firing "de big gun" at the town twice, with minimal effect. He then demands "what else was there to do?" (variants of this phrase are used throughout the story when discussing the ants) and returns downstream for orders. A final section reports that Holroyd has returned to England to warn the authorities about the ants "before it is too late".

"The Empire of the Ants" was first published in 1905 in The Strand Magazine.

Background
H. G. Wells had befriended Joseph Conrad in 1898 and admired his work.

References

External links

 
"EMPIRE OF THE ANTS: H.G. Wells and Tropical Entomology". Sleigh, C. Science as Culture, Volume 10, Number 1, 1 March 2001, pp. 33–71

1905 short stories
Fictional ants
Short stories adapted into films
Short stories by H. G. Wells
Works originally published in The Strand Magazine